Chief of Staff of the Air Force may refer to:

 Chief of Staff of the French Air Force
 Chief of Staff of the Indonesian Air Force
 Chief of Staff of the Italian Air Force
 Chief of Staff of the Air Force (South Korea)
 Chief of Staff of the Air Force (Spain)
 Chief of Staff of the United States Air Force

See also
Air force (disambiguation)
 Chief of Air Force (disambiguation)
 Chief of the Air Staff (disambiguation)
 Chief of the Defence Staff (disambiguation)